Romeo Bosetti (18 January 1879 – 27 October 1948) was an Italian-born French actor and screenwriter.

Bosetti was born in Romolus Joseph Bosetti Chiari, Italy and died in 1948 in Suresnes, France.

1879 births
1948 deaths
French male film actors
French film directors
French film producers
French male screenwriters
20th-century French screenwriters
French male silent film actors
Italian male film actors
Italian male silent film actors
Silent film directors
20th-century French male actors
Italian emigrants to France
20th-century Italian male actors
Mass media people from the Province of Brescia
20th-century French male writers